Retrosynthetic analysis is a technique for solving problems in the planning of organic syntheses. This is achieved by transforming a target molecule into simpler precursor structures regardless of any potential reactivity/interaction with reagents. Each precursor material is examined using the same method. This procedure is repeated until simple or commercially available structures are reached. These simpler/commercially available compounds can be used to form a synthesis of the target molecule. E.J. Corey formalized this concept in his book The Logic of Chemical Synthesis.

The power of retrosynthetic analysis becomes evident in the design of a synthesis. The goal of retrosynthetic analysis is a structural simplification. Often, a synthesis will have more than one possible synthetic route. Retrosynthesis is well suited for discovering different synthetic routes and comparing them in a logical and straightforward fashion. A database may be consulted at each stage of the analysis, to determine whether a component already exists in the literature. In that case, no further exploration of that compound would be required. If that compound exists, it can be a jumping point for further steps developed to reach a synthesis.

Definitions
Disconnection A retrosynthetic step involving the breaking of a bond to form two (or more) synthons.
Retron A minimal molecular substructure that enables certain transformations.
Retrosynthetic tree A directed acyclic graph of several (or all) possible retrosyntheses of a single target.
Synthon A fragment of a compound that assists in the formation of a synthesis, derived from that target molecule. A synthon and the corresponding commercially available synthetic equivalent are shown below:

Target The desired final compound.
Transform The reverse of a synthetic reaction; the formation of starting materials from a single product.

Example
An example will allow the concept of retrosynthetic analysis to be easily understood.

In planning the synthesis of phenylacetic acid, two synthons are identified. A nucleophilic "-COOH" group, and an electrophilic "PhCH2+" group. Of course, both synthons do not exist per se; synthetic equivalents corresponding to the synthons are reacted to produce the desired product. In this case, the cyanide anion is the synthetic equivalent for the −COOH synthon, while benzyl bromide is the synthetic equivalent for the benzyl synthon.

The synthesis of phenylacetic acid determined by retrosynthetic analysis is thus:

 PhCH2Br + NaCN → PhCH2CN + NaBr
 PhCH2CN + 2 H2O → PhCH2COOH + NH3

In fact, phenylacetic acid has been synthesized from benzyl cyanide, itself prepared by the analogous reaction of benzyl bromide with sodium cyanide.

Strategies

Functional group strategies
Manipulation of functional groups can lead to significant reductions in molecular complexity.

Stereochemical strategies
Numerous chemical targets have distinct stereochemical demands. Stereochemical transformations (such as the Claisen rearrangement and Mitsunobu reaction) can remove or transfer the desired chirality thus simplifying the target.

Structure-goal strategies
Directing a synthesis toward a desirable intermediate can greatly narrow the focus of analysis. This allows bidirectional search techniques.

Transform-based strategies
The application of transformations to retrosynthetic analysis can lead to powerful reductions in molecular complexity. Unfortunately, powerful transform-based retrons are rarely present in complex molecules, and additional synthetic steps are often needed to establish their presence.

Topological strategies
The identification of one or more key bond disconnections may lead to the identification of key substructures or difficult to identify rearrangement transformations in order to identify the key structures.
 Disconnections that preserve ring structures are encouraged.
 Disconnections that create rings larger than 7 members are discouraged.
Disconnection involves creativity.

See also
 Organic synthesis
 Total synthesis

References

External links

 Centre for Molecular and Biomolecular Informatics
 Presentation on ARChem Route Designer, ACS, Philadelphia, September 2008 for more info on ARChem see the SimBioSys pages.
 Manifold, Software freely available for academic users developed by PostEra
 Retrosynthesis planning tool: ICSynth by InfoChem
 Spaya, Software freely available proposed by Iktos

Chemical synthesis
Organic chemistry
Chemical reaction engineering